Potamites erythrocularis is a species of lizards in the family Gymnophthalmidae. It is endemic to Manu National Park, in the Region of Cusco, Peru.

Description
Adult males measure  in snout–vent length. The dorsum is brownish, where lateral ocelli can be seen as two or three pairs in males. Lateral ocelli usually absent in females. Male has red bright on lower extremities and belly in ventrum, creamy or pale blue in chest region and some dark blotches on throat and head. In females, limbs, chest and tail are yellow to pale brown in ventrum with orange belly and creamy white throat and head.

References

Potamites
Endemic fauna of Peru
Reptiles of Peru
Reptiles described in 2017
Taxa named by German Chavez
Taxa named by Alessandro Catenazzi
Lizards of South America